John Patton (March 1, 1822 – November 15, 1900) was the mayor of Detroit, Michigan, in 1858-1859.

Biography
John Patton was born March 1, 1822, in the county of County Down, Ireland, the son of James and Eliza Patton. In 1830, John and his father emigrated to Albany, New York, and were joined by the rest of the family the next year. At 17, John Patton was apprenticed as a carriagesmith, and in 1843 moved to Detroit, where he worked for others at his trade. Two years later, he went into business as a carriagemaker for himself.  The fire of 1848 destroyed his factory, but Patton soon rebuilt, and his business prospered.

In 1845, Patton married Eliza J. Anderson. The couple had five children:  William, Walter, Mrs. John McLean, Mrs. E. B. Gay, and John.

Patton rapidly became popular in the city, due in part to his "masterly" delivery of reading, thespian skills, and command of Scotch and Irish dialects. He served as chief engineer of the Fire Department in 1852-1854 and its president from 1855 to 1857. He was a Democrat in politics, and awas elected a city alderman in 1853-1854, mayor in 1858-1859, county auditor in 1864-1869, Wayne County, Michigan, sheriff in 1869-1870, Justice of the Peace from 1880- 1892 and United States consul at Amherstburg, Ontario, from 1893 to 1897.

John Patton died November 15, 1900.

References

1822 births
1900 deaths
Mayors of Detroit
Detroit City Council members
People from County Down
Politicians from Albany, New York
Irish emigrants to the United States (before 1923)
19th-century American politicians